Totally Hits 2002 is an album in the Totally Hits series. The album peaked at No. 2 on the Billboard 200. A lip-sync karaoke contest was held at a Tower Records in Los Angeles, California, on June 27, 2002 to promote the album with appearances by radio personality Ellen K, news anchor Mindy Burbano, then-CEO of WMG Kevin Gore, actor AJ Lamas, and actress Kyla Pratt.

Track listing
Fat Joe featuring Ashanti – "What's Luv?" (3:51)
Tweet featuring Missy Elliott – "Oops (Oh My)" (Radio Edit) (3:55)
Pink – "Get the Party Started" (3:10)
Brandy – "What About Us?" (Radio Mix) (3:57)
Craig David – "7 Days" (3:52)
Fabolous – "Young'n (Holla Back)" (3:26)
Outkast featuring Killer Mike – "The Whole World" (4:17)
Michelle Branch – "Everywhere" (3:33)
The Calling – "Wherever You Will Go" (3:25)
Default – "Wasting My Time" (4:27)
P.O.D. – "Youth of the Nation" (4:04)
Alanis Morissette – "Hands Clean" (4:27)
Natalie Imbruglia – "Wrong Impression" (4:14)
Jewel – "Standing Still" (4:29)
O-Town – "We Fit Together" (3:57)
Faith Evans – "I Love You" (4:00)
Alicia Keys – "A Woman's Worth" (4:16)
LeAnn Rimes – "Can't Fight the Moonlight" (Graham Stack Radio Edit) (3:36)
Busta Rhymes with P. Diddy & Pharrell – "Pass the Courvoisier, Part II" (4:10)
Jaheim featuring Next – "Anything" (4:04)

Charts

Weekly charts

Year-end charts

Certifications

References

Totally Hits
2002 compilation albums